Norman Brown (born 10 September 1961 in Bankfoot, Perth and Kinross, Scotland) is a Scottish male curler.

He is a four-time ,  silver and bronze medallist, played for the Great Britain team in two Winter Olympics: 1992 (where curling was a demonstration sport; 5th place) and 2002 (7th place).

Brown started curling at the age of nine, when the Stranraer rink first opened in 1970.

Teams

References

External links

History - British Curling

1961 births
Living people
People from Bankfoot
Sportspeople from Perth and Kinross
Scottish male curlers
British male curlers
European curling champions
Scottish curling champions
Curlers at the 1992 Winter Olympics
Curlers at the 2002 Winter Olympics
Olympic curlers of Great Britain
Continental Cup of Curling participants